Bert Davis (11 August 1906 – 1981) was an English footballer who played as a winger for Guiseley, Bradford Park Avenue, Sunderland, Leicester City and Crystal Palace. He was born in Bradford.

Club career
Davis began his professional career at Bradford Park Avenue where he helped them win the Third Division North title in his first season in 1928  and also scored the winner in a famous FA Cup upset of Derby County in 1930. Davis left Bradford in 1932 and made his debut for Sunderland on 27 August in a 3–2 win against Manchester City at Roker Park. He helped Sunderland become league champions in the 1935–36 season, but was ousted his position by Len Duns, forcing him to miss out on Sunderland's 1937 FA Cup. In his career at Sunderland, Davis made 162 appearances and scored 40 goals.

References

1906 births
1981 deaths
Footballers from Bradford
English footballers
Association football outside forwards
Guiseley A.F.C. players
Bradford (Park Avenue) A.F.C. players
Sunderland A.F.C. players
Leicester City F.C. players
Crystal Palace F.C. players
English Football League players